James French Patton (September 19, 1843 – March 30, 1882) was an American lawyer, Confederate army officer and Democratic politician who briefly served on the Supreme Court of Appeals of West Virginia.

Early and family life

Patton was born in Richmond, Virginia on September 19, 1843 to former Congressman John M. Patton and his wife, the former Peggy French Williams of Richmond, Virginia. His great-grandfather was Gen. Hugh Mercer who fought at the Battle of Princeton in 1776.  At age 14, Patton was enrolled in Andover Academy, but after Virginia seceded from the Union, he returned to his home state and became a lieutenant in the Confederate Army.

In 1869, Patton married Malinda Caperton (1842-1922), the daughter of U.S. Senator Allen T. Caperton. They had two children, Harriet Echols Patton Edwards (1870-1929) and Allen Gilmer Patton (1871-1910). A. Gilmer Patton was also a lawyer and was elected to the West Virginia legislature shortly before his death.

Career

Admitted to the Virginia bar after the war, Patton after his marriage joined a law partnership with Caperton and relocated to Union in Monroe County, West Virginia. In 1872, Patton was elected as a Democrat as prosecuting attorney of Monroe County and served four years.
On June 1, 1881, Governor Jacob B. Jackson appointed Patton to a vacated seat on the Supreme Court of Appeals of West Virginia caused by the retirement of Justice Charles P.T. Moore.

Death and legacy
Patton died suddenly of a heart condition on March 30, 1882 in Wheeling, West Virginia at the age of 38. His brother Isaac W. Patton was a soldier, plantation owner, and the mayor of New Orleans, Louisiana. World War II general George S. Patton Jr. was the grandchild of James French Patton's brother George S. Patton.

See also
List of justices of the Supreme Court of Appeals of West Virginia

References

External links
Men of West Virginia, Vol. 1, pg. 215

1843 births
1882 deaths
Lawyers from Richmond, Virginia
Patton family
West Virginia Democrats
Confederate States Army officers
County prosecuting attorneys in West Virginia
People from Union, West Virginia
Phillips Academy alumni
Justices of the Supreme Court of Appeals of West Virginia
Virginia lawyers
West Virginia lawyers
Caperton family of Virginia and West Virginia
Military personnel from Richmond, Virginia